Gürsel Aksel (10 May 1937 – 13 October 1978), was a Turkish footballer who played as a midfielder. Aksel spent his entire professional career with Göztepe, and is their most capped player in their history. He had three caps with the Turkey national football team, and after retiring was briefly a manager before his untimely death in 1978.

Professional career and death
Aksel joined Göztepe in 1955, at the same time as his brother Güler Aksel who was the first footballer to sign professionally for the team. He debuted professionally in 1959, and played 390 games with 81 goals over his 14 seasons with the team in the Süper Lig. He is the all-time appearance leader in the history of Göztepe, and their second-most prolific scorer.

After his career, Aksel had a brief stint in management with Göztepe, Orduspor, and Çaykur Rizespor. On 13 October 1978, Aksel died in an explosion in a gas station in Rize, Turkey. He was survived by his wife and two children. Göztepe's home stadium, Gürsel Aksel Stadium, is named in his honour.

Honours
Göztepe
Turkish Cup (2): 1968–69, 1969–70

References

External links
 
 
 Mackolik Manager profile
 NFT Profile

1937 births
1978 deaths
People from Edirne Province
Turkish footballers
Turkish football managers
Turkey international footballers
Turkey youth international footballers
Association football midfielders
Göztepe S.K. footballers
Göztepe S.K. managers
Orduspor managers
Çaykur Rizespor managers
Süper Lig players
Süper Lig managers
Accidental deaths in Turkey
20th-century Turkish people